Merry Christmas is a holiday album by German pop singer Jeanette. It was released by Universal Records on 22 November 2004 in Germany.

Track listing

Charts

References

External links
Official website

Jeanette Biedermann albums
2004 Christmas albums
Christmas albums by German artists
Pop Christmas albums